Lobelia pedunculata, commonly known as matted pratia, trailing pratia or blue star creeper, is a perennial herb from Australia.

It has sky-blue starry flowers, and can spread by underground stolon. In a garden setting some gardeners have found its ability to spread to be a nuisance.

Varieties
One variety, Lobelia pedunculata var. Almanda Blue, was found in Scott Creek Conservation Park in 2013 by John Wamsley. It has a dense weeping habit and small, female-only flowers. Wamsley registered it as intellectual property under Australia's plant breeders' rights and as a US patent. Clones of this plant are sold as garden plants, and royalties go toward preserving biodiversity in the park it was found in.

References

pedunculata
Flora of the Australian Capital Territory
Flora of New South Wales
Flora of Queensland
Flora of South Australia
Flora of Tasmania
Flora of Victoria (Australia)
Flora of Western Australia